Stopnik is a dispersed settlement in the valley of the Idrijca River in the Municipality of Tolmin in the Littoral region of Slovenia.

References

External links
Stopnik on Geopedia

Populated places in the Municipality of Tolmin